Raúl Giménez (born September 14, 1950), is an Argentine operatic tenor, particularly associated with the Italian bel canto vocal style.

Giménez was born in Carlos Pellegrini, Province of Santa Fe, Argentina. He studied at the Music Conservatory of Buenos Aires and made his operatic debut at the Teatro Colón as Ernesto in Don Pasquale, in 1980. After appearing in concert and opera throughout South America, he came to Europe in 1984, where he made his debut at the Wexford Festival in Ireland, in Cimarosa's Le astuzie femminili. He's appeared at opera houses and festivals of Europe.

Giménez made his American debut in Dallas in 1989, as Ernesto in Don Pasquale. At the Metropolitan Opera New York, his debut was as Count Almaviva in "Il Barbiere di Siviglia" in 1996. He also appeared frequently in works by Donizetti and Bellini, as well as composers such as Salieri and Pacini.

Giménez has maintained a parallel career in the concert hall.  His 1987 Nimbus release Argentinian Songs, with pianist Nina Walker, included works by Ginastera and Guastavino, Carlos Buchardo, and introduced composer Abraham Jurafsky to a global audience.

Selected recordings
 Rossini - L'italiana in Algeri, Teldec
 Rossini - Il barbiere di Siviglia, Teldec
 Rossini - La cenerentola, Teldec
 Rossini - L'inganno felice, Erato
 Rossini - La Pietra del Paragone ROF
 Rossini - Il Turco in Italia, Philips
 Rossini - Il Viaggio a Reims, Sony 
 Mayr - Medea in Corinto, Opera Rara
 Bellini - La sonnambula, Naxos
 Salieri - Les Danaïdes, EMI
 Rossini - Stabat Mater, DG
 Rossini - Messa di Gloria, Philips
 Rossini - La petite messe solennelle, Philips
 Pacini - L'ultimo giorno di Pompei, Dynamic

References

1951 births
Living people
Argentine operatic tenors
Illustrious Citizens of Buenos Aires
20th-century Argentine male opera singers